The 1958 United States Senate election in New Mexico took place on November 4, 1958. Incumbent Democratic Senator Dennis Chávez won re-election to a fifth term.

Primary elections
Primary elections were held on May 13, 1958.

Democratic primary

Candidates
Dennis Chávez, incumbent U.S. Senator
E. S. Johnny Walker, former State Land Commissioner

Results

Republican primary

Candidates
Forrest S. Atchley, former State Representative, Republican nominee for New Mexico's at-large congressional district in 1956
Reginaldo Espinoza, former State Senator

Results

General election

Results

See also 
 1958 United States Senate elections

References

Bibliography
 

1958
New Mexico
United States Senate